In information theory, dual total correlation (Han 1978), information rate (Dubnov 2006), excess entropy (Olbrich 2008),  or binding information (Abdallah and Plumbley 2010) is one of several known non-negative generalizations of mutual information.  While total correlation is bounded by the sum entropies of the n elements, the dual total correlation is bounded by the joint-entropy of the n elements.  Although well behaved, dual total correlation has received much less attention than the total correlation.  A measure known as "TSE-complexity" defines a continuum between the total correlation and dual total correlation (Ay 2001).

Definition

For a set of n random variables , the dual total correlation  is given by

Normalized
The dual total correlation normalized between [0,1] is simply the dual total correlation divided by its maximum value ,

Bounds
Dual total correlation is non-negative and bounded above by the joint entropy .

Secondly, Dual total correlation has a close relationship with total correlation, .  In particular,

History
Han (1978) originally defined the dual total correlation as,
 
However Abdallah and Plumbley (2010) showed its equivalence to the easier-to-understand form of the joint entropy minus the sum of conditional entropies via the following:

See also
Interaction information
Mutual information
Total correlation

References
 
 
 
 
 
 Nihat Ay, E. Olbrich, N. Bertschinger (2001).  A unifying framework for complexity measures of finite systems.  European Conference on Complex Systems. pdf.

Information theory
Probability theory
Covariance and correlation